Richard Speight (2 December 1838 – 19 September 1901) was an English-born commissioner of railways in the Australian state of Victoria, serving between 1883 and 1892. In his latter years, Speight was briefly a Member of the Western Australian Legislative Assembly.

Biography
Speight was born in Selby, Yorkshire, England. He was brought up from boyhood in the service of the Midland Railway Company until he attained a responsible position on the management. Speight accepted the new post of railway commissioner of the Railways Department of Victoria, in 1883. He was tasked with implementing the Railway Construction Act 1884, along with fellow commissioners Alfred John Agg and R. Ford. The Act called for the construction of fifty-nine new lines and additional works. Conservative by nature, Speight preferred to invest in quality infrastructure in order to reduce operational and maintenance costs. However, this policy was in opposition to political leaders including Thomas Bent and John Woods; and it was considered that Speight had over–extended the State.

Amidst allegations of corruption and mismanagement and within the setting depressed economic conditions, Speight and the other commissioners eventually resigned in 1892 following the enactment of the Railways Act, 1892 that relieved the commissioners of railway construction and reduced much of their power. Almost immediately, he sued David Syme, then the editor of The Age, for £25,000, alleging libel. Speight lost nine of the ten cases, and was awarded one farthing in damages for the case won.

He relocated to Western Australia, gradually moving to the private sector as director of Jarrahdale Jarrah Forests and Railways. At the 1901 state election, Speight won the seat of North Perth as an independent candidate.

He died on 19 September 1901, survived by eight children.

References

People from Perth, Western Australia
History of Victoria (Australia)
Rail transport in Victoria (Australia)
Australian people in rail transport
1838 births
1901 deaths
Members of the Western Australian Legislative Assembly
19th-century Australian politicians
Burials at Karrakatta Cemetery